The Charles F. Adams House is a historic house located in northwest Portland, Oregon, United States. It was designed by the eminent firm of Whidden and Lewis, one of a trio of adjacent residences designed by that firm. Built in the Georgian Revival style in 1904 and expanded in 1918, it was extensively restored in 1979. The original owner was Charles Francis Adams (1862–1943), a scion of the family of presidents John Adams and John Quincy Adams, and a prominent Portland banker, art collector, and patron of the Portland Art Museum.

The house was listed on the National Register of Historic Places in 1981.

See also
 National Register of Historic Places listings in Northwest Portland, Oregon
 Bates–Seller House, neighboring by same architect
 Trevett–Nunn House, neighboring by same architect

References

External links
 
 Oregon Historic Sites Database entry

1904 establishments in Oregon
Colonial Revival architecture in Oregon
Georgian Revival architecture in Oregon
Houses completed in 1904
Houses on the National Register of Historic Places in Portland, Oregon
Northwest District, Portland, Oregon
Portland Historic Landmarks